This is a list of child actors from the United States. These actors must be aged 17 or under. When they turn 18, they legally become adults and are no longer listed as child actors but will be moved to the list of American former child actors.

A 
Aubrey Anderson-Emmons (born 2007)
Modern Family (2011–2020)
Iain Armitage (born 2008)
Big Little Lies (2017–19)
Young Sheldon (2017–present)
Scoob! (2020)
PAW Patrol: The Movie (2021)
Zackary Arthur (born 2006)
Transparent (2014–19)
The 5th Wave (2016)
Mom and Dad (2017)
Kidding (2018–20)

B 
Asher Blinkoff (born 2008)
Hotel Transylvania 2 (2015)
The Jungle Book (2016)
Hotel Transylvania 3: Summer Vacation (2018)

C 
Darby Camp (born 2007)
The Leftovers (2015–17)
Big Little Lies (2017–19)
Benji (2018)
The Christmas Chronicles (2018)
Dreamland (2019)
The Christmas Chronicles 2 (2020)
Clifford the Big Red Dog (2021)

Kyliegh Curran (born 2005)
Doctor Sleep (2019)

D 
Jason Drucker (born 2005)
Diary of a Wimpy Kid: The Long Haul (2017)
Bumblebee (2018)

E 
Ella Anderson (born 2005)
Henry Danger (2014–20)
The Adventures of Kid Danger (2018)

F
Abby Ryder Fortson (born 2008)
Ant-Man (2015)
Ant-Man and the Wasp (2018)

G 
Pierce Gagnon (born 2005)
The Way Home (2010)
Extant (2014–15)
Rio 2 (2014) 
The Boss Baby: Back in Business (2018–2020)
Mckenna Grace (born 2006)
Gifted (2017)
Amityville: The Awakening (2017)
The Bad Seed (2018)
Troop Zero (2019)
Annabelle Comes Home (2019)
Ghostbusters: Afterlife (2021)
Malignant (2021)

J
Joshua Caleb Johnson (born 2005)
The Good Lord Bird (2020)

K
Ava Kolker (born 2006)
Scary Movie 5 (2013)
Sydney to the Max (2019–2021)

M 
Lia McHugh (born 2005)
American Woman (2018)
The Lodge (2019)
Eternals (2021)

P 
Brooklynn Prince (born 2010)
The Florida Project (2017)
The Turning (2020)
Home Before Dark (2020)
The One and Only Ivan (2020)

R 
Isabella Rice (born 2006)
True Blood (2014)
Pretty Little Liars (2014-15)
Jem and the Holograms (2015)
Unforgettable (2017)
Our Friend (2019)

S 
Sunny Suljic (born 2005)
1915 (2015)
The Killing of a Sacred Deer (2017)
Mid90s (2018)
The House with a Clock in Its Walls (2018)
The Christmas Chronicles 2 (2020)
North Hollywood (2021)

T 
Thalia Tran (born 2006)
Little (2019)
Council of Dads (2020)
Raya and the Last Dragon (2021)

W 
Izaac Wang (born 2007)
Teachers (2019)
Good Boys (2019)
Think Like a Dog (2020)
Raya and the Last Dragon (2021)
Clifford the Big Red Dog (2021)
Gremlins: Secrets of the Mogwai (2023–present)

See also
 List of American former child actors

Notes
For estimating the age at the time of shooting, note that above the years of release are given.
If the movie title does not have an article on Wikipedia please delink.

Footnotes 

 Current
Current child actors
American, current
American current child actors